Abdul Aziz Mohd Tamit (born 23 September 1966) is the 8th Commander of the Royal Brunei Navy (RBN) from 2014 to 2015. He was also the Deputy Minister of Defence.

Education 
Throughout his career, he attended several institutes and training overseas; the Britannia Royal Naval College, United Kingdom in 1985, the International Sub Lieutenant, International Communication and Electronic Warfare, International Principal Warfare Officer Courses in United Kingdom, the Naval Junior Staff Course in Australia, the Naval Staff Course at Naval War College, Newport, United States in 1999, the National Security Staff Course at Canadian Forces College, Toronto, Canada in 2006, the Executive Development Programme at Universiti Brunei Darussalam in 2002, the Negotiation Programme at Said Business School, University of Oxford, England in 2007, the Senior Executives in National and International Security at Harvard Kennedy School, Cambridge, United States in 2013.

Career

Military career 
In January 1984, he joined the Royal Brunei Armed Forces (RBAF) and graduated as a midshipman that following year. Abdul Aziz rose to the rank of Lieutenant Junior Grade in 1986 and later Lieutenant in 1990. He was promoted to Lieutenant commander and Commander, in 1994 and 2002 respectively. During his service with the Navy, Commander Abdul Aziz held several positions including gunnery officer, navigation officer and executive officer of several ships; KDB Perwira (P-14), KDB Pejuang (P-03) and KDB Waspada (P-02).

Several other notable positions held by him include the RBN's Fleet Commander twice from 9 March 2003 to 22 December 2005 and 29 June 2006 to 1 April 2007. Upon his promotion to the rank of Captain in 2006, he was appointed as; the SO3 Doctrine and Staff Duties in Directorate of Training, the Head of Naval Project in Directorate of Operations in 2007, the Head of Special Project in Deputy Minister of Defence Secretariat, the Director of Force Capability Development and Director of Operations on 14 November 2007.

Before being finally promoted to First Admiral in 2011, Captain Abdul Aziz was the RBAF's Joint Force Commander on 23 November 2009. Later appointed as the 9th Commander of RBN on 28 February 2014. Not long after his appointment, the RBN would reach another milestone by joining the Multilateral Maritime Exercise (MMEx) and International Fleet Review (IFR) for the first time. The exercise hosted by the People's Liberation Army Navy would be joined by KDB Darulehsan (07) in Qingdao, China from 20 to 24 April 2014. Later that year on 9 September, him alongside Commander Mohammad Tawih and Sultan Hassanal Bolkiah attended the commissioning ceremony of the newly acquired KDB Daruttaqwa (09) at Muara Naval Base. 

Another Navy milestone was achieved during RIMPAC's SINKEX on 18 July 2014, when KDB Darussalam (06) and KDB Darulaman (08) successfully launched their Exocet MM40 missiles. On 13 March 2015, the handover ceremony was held between Abdul Aziz and Norazmi Mohammad.

Political career 
On 13 March 2015, he was appointed as the Deputy Minister at the Ministry of Defence. To improve understandings on naval aviation and carrier strike group operations, Ambassador Craig B. Allen and Deputy Minister Abdul Aziz visited the USS John C. Stennis (CVN-74), hosted by Rear Admiral Marcus A. Hitchcock on 18 May 2016. On 16 November 2017, he became the guest of honour during the decommissioning ceremony of his previous ship, KDB Perwira. After an officially announcement on 7 June 2022, Abdul Razak Abd. Kadir would replace him as the new Deputy minister after the 2022 cabinet reshuffle.

Personal life
Khairul Hamed is married to Sakdiah binti Haji Mohd Noor and has three children together. In addition, he enjoys golfing and reading.

Honours

National 

  Order of Pahlawan Negara Brunei First Class (PSPNB) – Dato Seri Pahlawan (16 July 2011)
  Order of Seri Paduka Mahkota Brunei Third Class (SMB) – (15 July 2006)
  Long Service Medal (Armed Forces)
  Silver Jubilee Medal – (5 October 1992)
  General Service Medal (Armed Forces)
  Royal Brunei Armed Forces Silver Jubilee Medal – (31 May 1986)
  Royal Brunei Armed Forces Golden Jubilee Medal – (31 May 2011)

Foreign 

 :
  Pingat Jasa Gemilang – (11 June 2015)

References

Living people 
Bruneian military leaders
1966 births